The Manu antbird (Cercomacra manu) is a species of bird in the family Thamnophilidae. It is found in Brazil, Bolivia, and Peru. Its natural habitat is subtropical or tropical moist lowland forests.

References

Manu antbird
Birds of the Amazon Basin
Birds of the Brazilian Amazon
Birds of the Bolivian Amazon
Birds of the Peruvian Amazon
Manu antbird
Taxonomy articles created by Polbot